Savo is a masculine given name found in South Slavic, Albanian and Italian-speaking places. It can be a cognate to Sava or to Savio.

Notable people with the name include:

 Savo Dobranić (born 1964), Serbian politician
 Savo Ekmečić (born 1948), Bosnian football player
 Savo Fatić (1889–1948), Montenegrin and Yugoslav jurist
 Savo Gazivoda (born 1994), Montenegrin football player
 Savo Gjirja (born 1945), Albanian research engineer
 Savo Jovanović (born 1999), Serbian football player
 Savo Klimovski (born 1947), Macedonian lawyer and politician
 Savo Kovačević (born 1988), Serbian football player
 Savo Lazarević (1849–1943), Montenegrin and Yugoslav military officer
 Savo Martinović (born 1935), Montenegrin-Serbian satirist
 Savo Millini (1644–1701), Italian Roman Catholic cardinal
 Savo Milošević (born 1973), Serbian football manager and player
 Savo Mitrovic (born 1969), Serbian-Canadian ice hockey player
 Savo Nakićenović (1882–1926), Serbian priest and scientist
 Savo Pavićević (born 1980), Serbian-born Montenegrin football player
 Savo Pređa, Serbian general and politician
 Savo Radulović (1911–1991), Serbian American painter
 Savo Raković (born 1985), Serbian football player
 Savo Sovre (1928–2008), Slovene painter and illustrator
 Savo Štrbac (born 1949), Croatian Serb lawyer and author
 Savo Zlatić (1912–2007), Croatian physician, politician and chess composer

Serbian masculine given names
Montenegrin masculine given names